The ninth season of American talent show competition series America's Got Talent was broadcast on NBC from May 27 to September 17, 2014. Following the previous season, the program underwent a number of format changes, including the second audition stage and to the Wildcard format. The most significant change to be made was the inclusion of the "Golden Buzzer", an element that was being introduced into the Got Talent franchise around that time (although the format used would later be changed by the next season). Apart from the format changes, the ninth season's audition process featured the first and only involvement of a third-party television program to collaborate with America's Got Talent in offering a place in the competition.

The ninth season was won by magician Mat Franco, with singer Emily West finishing in second, and acrobatic group Acro Army placing third. During its broadcast, the season averaged around over 10.2 million viewers.

Season overview 
Auditions for the eighth season's competition took place during 2013 between October to December in Miami, Atlanta, Baltimore, Denver, Houston, Indianapolis, Los Angeles, New York City, and Providence, Rhode Island. Contestants could also submit a video of their audition online. The judges' auditions had a number of sessions held across three major venues the following year in 2014, the first within February at the New Jersey Performing Arts Center in Newark, while the other two took place in April within Madison Square Garden in New York City and the Dolby Theatre in Los Angeles.

Production on the season had a number of changes made. One of the most significant was the introduction of the "Golden Buzzer" format, a new addition that was brought into other editions of the Got Talent franchise. While the format was assigned to the auditions round, it functioned differently in its first use. Anyone who received the buzzer would simply gain a place in the next stage of auditions automatically, although only the judges could use it. In effect, the new buzzer was used mainly to save an act from elimination or to break up a 2-2 tie vote by judges in the auditions. Later seasons would alter the rules for the Golden Buzzer to match that of other international editions. 

Another change was to incorporate an online public vote in the live rounds, named after the program's sponsor at the time, which allowed viewers to grant an automatic place in the finals to a semi-finalist in each semi-final. While they could vote via Google, they could only vote on those placed 5th, 6th and 7th in the main public vote respectively, with the remaining two who lost out facing a vote from the judges for advancement. Although the format remained for later seasons, with a different name following a change in sponsor, the ninth season is the only one in the program's history to allow this format to be used in the finals as well. Other changes that were made included a reduction in the number of quarter-finalists and quarter-finals, and the second stage of auditions being conducted in New York, rather than in Las Vegas. It retained the same format of "Vegas Verdicts", but was made more competitive and renamed as "Judgement Week". It was also originally intended to have a live audience, but this idea was later dropped. 

One prominent element of the ninth season that was unusual for America's Got Talent, a decision that would not be repeated in later seasons, was to involve another television show. With the collaborative help from The Today Show, a place in the competition's live round was offered to an additional participant. The involvement of a third-party television program in the competition's audition process focused on a simple arrangement. Participants wanting a place in the competition could submit a recording of their performance on the website for The Today Show. The top three entries from these would then conduct a further performance in late July 2014 on the program, and the best of these voted for by the program's viewers would earn a place in the live rounds of the competition.

Forty-eight of the participants who auditioned for this season secured a place in the live quarter-finals, with twelve quarter-finalists performing in each show. About twenty quarter-finalists advanced and were split between the two semi-finals (including four Wildcard acts selected by the judges), with twelve semi-finalists securing a place in the finals, and six finalists securing a place in the grand-final. These are the results of each participant's overall performance during the season:

 |  |  | 
 |  |  Wildcard Semi-finalist

  Ages denoted for a participant(s), pertain to their final performance for this season.
  The ages of these participants were not disclosed on the program.
  The age of the dog in this act was not disclosed on the program.

Quarter-finals summary
 Buzzed Out |  Judges' choice | 
 |

Quarter-final 1 (July 29)
Guest Performers, Results Show: The Rockettes, Enrique Iglesias and Sean Paul

  Flight Crew Jump Rope were later appointed as Heidi Klum's Wildcard semi-finalist.

Quarter-final 2 (August 5) 
Guest Performers, Results Show: Lindsey Stirling, and Lzzy Hale

Quarter-final 3 (August 12) 
Guest Performers, Results Show: Kenichi Ebina, and Taylor Williamson

  Mike Super was later appointed as Howie Mandel's Wildcard semi-finalist.
  Wendy Liebman was later appointed Howard Stern's Wildcard semi-finalist.

Quarter-final 4 (August 19) 
Guest Performers, Results Show: Taylor Williamson, and The Illusionists 

  Bad Boys of Ballet were later appointed as Mel B's Wildcard semi-finalist.
  Due to the majority vote for Kelli Glover, Klum's voting intention was not revealed.

Semi-finals summary
 Buzzed Out |  Judges' choice | 
 |  |

Semi-final 1 (August 26) 
Guest Performer, Results Show: Ariana Grande

  Due to the majority vote for David & Leeman, Mel B's voting intention was not revealed.

Semi-final 2 (September 2) 
Guest Performers, Results: Maroon 5

Finals summary

Finals - Top 12 (September 9–10) 
Guest Performers, Results Show: The Muppets, and Jackie Evancho

 Buzzed Out |  Judges' choice | 
 |  |

Grand-Final (September 16) 
Guest Performers, Results Show: Pitbull & The Rockettes, and Ed Sheeran

 |  |

Ratings
The following ratings are based upon those published by Nielsen Media Research after this season's broadcast:

Recap Episodes

  This episode's weekly rank is not known because it was not among the 25 highest ranked shows of the week.

References

2014 American television seasons
America's Got Talent seasons